Sigfrid Hylander (5 December 1902 – 17 August 1978) was a Swedish weightlifter. He competed in the men's featherweight event at the 1924 Summer Olympics.

References

External links
 

1902 births
1978 deaths
Swedish male weightlifters
Olympic weightlifters of Sweden
Weightlifters at the 1924 Summer Olympics
People from Borås
Sportspeople from Västra Götaland County